Trelew is a city in Chubut Province, Argentina.

Trelew may also refer to:

 Trelew massacre, a retaliatory Argentine government killing of 16 militants in 1972
 Trelew, Cornwall, a hamlet in Cornwall, United Kingdom
 Trelew (band), a band based in Montevideo, Uruguay
 Omega Tower Trelew
 Racing de Trelew